The Hornitos Masonic Hall No. 98 is a historic Masonic Hall building in Hornitos, Mariposa County, California.

History
It was built in 1855 by Italian stonemasons who worked in the gold mines of the Mother Lode of the California Gold Rush.  It is classified as an unreinforced masonry building because its walls have no metal support. All rock, granite, and brick materials came from local sources.

During the first twenty years of its existence, the building served many different purposes, operating as a photography studio, a jewelry and watch store, tailor shop and finally as the Fashion Saloon.

Masonic Hall
It was purchased by Masons in August 1873 for $220, and they renovated it for a Masonic Hall.  Sometime in early 1875, the Masonic Hornitos Lodge No. 98 began holding regular meetings in the building and have occupied it ever since.

The building was listed on the National Register of Historic Places in 2005.

See also
National Register of Historic Places listings in Mariposa County, California

References

Masonic buildings in California
Buildings and structures in Mariposa County, California
Masonic buildings completed in 1855
Clubhouses on the National Register of Historic Places in California
National Register of Historic Places in Mariposa County, California